VU is a 1985 album by the American musical group the Velvet Underground, a compilation album of outtakes recorded 1968-69. It was released in February 1985 by Verve Records.

Composition and collection
When the Velvet Underground moved from Verve Records (who had released their first two albums) to parent company MGM Records, they signed a two-album deal, releasing their third album The Velvet Underground in March 1969. Later that same year there was a management change and MGM Records' new CEO, Mike Curb, was brought in to try to rescue the financially struggling label. He decided to purge the record company of its unprofitable acts. The Velvet Underground quickly became one of the groups targeted and were released from their contract. The band had in the meantime recorded 14 tracks for possible release as their second MGM album. All of these were shelved and forgotten by their record company until the early 1980s.

As Verve (by then an imprint of Polygram) prepared to re-release the band's three Verve/MGM albums on vinyl and CD, they found nineteen previously unreleased tracks: five Cale-era tracks and the 14 "lost album" tracks, some of them in two-track mixdown format, some of them even on multitracks. The cream of the nineteen tracks was released in 1985 as VU; the rest was released as Another View in 1986.

VU is a selection from the 1969 tracks as well as two previously unreleased Cale-era songs—"Temptation Inside Your Heart" and "Stephanie Says". Since most of the material was available on multitrack (only "Ocean" is included in its original 1969 mix), engineers were able to clean up and remix the tracks.

As the Velvet Underground moved from MGM to Atlantic, they re-recorded two of the songs on VU, "Ocean" and "I'm Sticking with You", for possible inclusion on Loaded. Neither made the cut, but six of the VU songs were recycled by Lou Reed during his solo career: "I Can't Stand It", "Lisa Says" and "Ocean" on Lou Reed, 1972; "Andy's Chest" on Transformer, 1972; "Stephanie Says" (as "Caroline Says II") on Berlin, 1973; and "She's My Best Friend" (which was originally sung by Doug Yule), was included on Coney Island Baby, 1976.

VU peaked in the US at #85, the band's best placing. As of October 2013 it had sold 90,000 copies according to Nielsen Soundscan.

Critical reception 

VU was ranked number 3 among the "Albums of the Year" for 1985 by NME. Village Voice rock critic Robert Christgau wrote, "It's goofy, relaxed, simultaneously conversational and obscure, an effect accentuated by the unfinished feel of takes the band never prepared for public consumption. As a result, especially given PolyGram's state-of-the-art remix, it's their most listenable record."

Track listing
All tracks written by Lou Reed except where noted.

*The CD issue of VU omits the first few seconds of "Foggy Notion", which includes a practice guitar lick and the band members talking.

All tracks appear on the box set Peel Slowly and See, except "She's My Best Friend", "Ocean" and "Andy's Chest".  "Ocean" on Peel Slowly and See is a later version, recorded during the Loaded sessions April – June 1970.

Personnel
The Velvet Underground
John Cale – viola, celesta and backing vocals on "Stephanie Says", bass guitar and backing vocals on "Temptation Inside Your Heart"
Sterling Morrison – guitar, backing vocals
Lou Reed – vocals, guitar
Maureen Tucker – percussion, lead vocals on "I'm Sticking with You"
Doug Yule – bass guitar, keyboards, lead vocals on "She's My Best Friend", backing vocals on "I Can't Stand It", "Lisa Says", "Foggy Notion", "One of These Days", "Andy's Chest", piano and backing vocals on "I'm Sticking with You",  lead guitar on "One of These Days"

Technical staff
The Velvet Underground – producers
Gary Kellgren – engineer
Bill Levenson – compilation executive producer
J. C. Convertino – compilation engineer

Charts 
VU is The Velvet Underground's highest charting album in the US, peaking at number 85 in the US Billboard charts on April 13, 1985. It remained in the Charts for 13 weeks.

References

1985 compilation albums
Albums produced by Doug Yule
Albums produced by John Cale
Albums produced by Lou Reed
Albums produced by Maureen Tucker
Albums produced by Sterling Morrison
The Velvet Underground compilation albums
Verve Records compilation albums